Chlamydephorus is a genus of air-breathing land slugs, terrestrial pulmonate gastropod mollusks in the family Chlamydephoridae. It is the only genus within the family Chlamydephoridae.

Taxonomy
The family Chlamydephoridae has no subfamilies and it is placed in the superfamily Rhytidoidea.

Chlamydephorus is the type genus of the family Chlamydephoridae.

Species
Species within the genus Chlamydephorus include:
 Chlamydephorus bruggeni
 Chlamydephorus burnupi (Smith, 1892) - Burnup's hunter slug
 Chlamydephorus dimidius (Watson, 1915) - Snake skin hunter slug
 Chlamydephorus gibbonsi Binney, 1879
 Chlamydephorus purcelli (Collinge, 1901) - Purcell's hunter slug
 Chlamydephorus sexangulus

Distribution
Species of Chlamydephorus occur across southern Africa; they are most commonly found in the Natal region of South Africa.

Description
Chlamydephorus slugs have an internal vestigial shell. The pallial organs are located at the posterior end of the elongated body and embedded under the dorsal integument. The elongation of the buccal mass varies greatly among the different species of the family and this is reflected in the size of the radula and the number of teeth. In all species the jaw is absent. The largest individuals of these slugs can be up to 120 mm in length.

Ecology
These slugs are believed to be mostly subterranean dwellers. Gut analysis of one species found both plant and animal matter, indicating that they are facultative predators who will also eat vegetation. They have been recorded as eating pill millipedes of the genus Sphaerotherium, snails, other arthropods and soft-bodied invertebrates such as earthworms. The prey is subdued by injecting a toxin into its flesh.

References

Further reading
 Boss K. J. (1982). Mollusca. In: Parker, S.P., Synopsis and Classification of Living Organisms, vol. 1. McGraw-Hill, New York: 945-1166.
 Forcart L. (1963) "Slugs of South Africa". Journal of Molluscan Studies 35(2-3): 103-110.
 Schlleyko A. A. (2000). "Treatise on Recent terrestrial pulmonate molluscs. Part 6. Rhytididae, Chlamydephoridae, Systrophiidae, Haplotrematidae, Streptaxidae, Spiraxidae, Oleacinidae, Testacellidae". Ruthenica, Suppl. 2: 729–880. 
 Watson H. (1915). "Studies on carnivorous slugs of South Africa". African Invertebrates. 107-267 + plates VII-XXIV.

Chlamydephoridae
Taxonomy articles created by Polbot